Sectoral collective bargaining is an aim of trade unions or labor unions to reach a collective agreement that covers all workers in a sector of the economy. It contrasts to enterprise bargaining where agreements cover individual firms. Generally countries with sectoral collective bargaining have higher rates of union organisation and better coverage of collective agreements than countries with enterprise bargaining.

Coverage by country
Countries that have sectoral collective bargaining have significantly higher rates of coverage than those with enterprise or individual workplace bargaining.

United Kingdom
While sectoral bargaining used to be standard in the UK, enterprise bargaining was advocated by the 1968 report of the Royal Commission on Trade Unions and Employers' Associations chaired by Lord Donovan.

United States
Sectoral bargaining was promoted by the National Industrial Recovery Act of 1933, but struck down and replaced by enterprise bargaining under the National Labor Relations Act of 1935.

See also
A Manifesto for Labour Law
US labor law
UK labour law
German labour law

Notes

References
H Collins, KD Ewing and A McColgan, Labour law in context (Cambridge University Press 2012)
L Fulton, 'Worker representation in Europe' (2015) Labour Research Department and ETUI
Collective bargaining coverage from worker-participation.eu 

Labour law
United Kingdom labour law
United States labor law